Henry Temple may refer to:
 Henry Temple, 1st Viscount Palmerston (c.1673–1757), Irish nobleman and British politician
 Henry Temple, 2nd Viscount Palmerston (1739–1802), grandson of the above, Irish nobleman and British politician
 Henry John Temple, 3rd Viscount Palmerston (1784–1865), son of the above, Prime Minister of the United Kingdom
 Henry Wilson Temple (1864–1955), Republican politician from Pennsylvania

See also
 Viscount Palmerston